St Mullin's is a Gaelic Athletic Association club located on the banks of the river Barrow beneath the Blackstairs mountains in St Mullin's, County Carlow, Ireland. The club, founded in 1914, primarily involves hurling.

Honours

 Carlow Senior Hurling Championships: (28) 1932, 1949, 1950, 1951, 1952, 1953, 1954, 1957, 1958, 1959, 1960, 1962, 1965, 1966, 1968, 1983, 1984, 1989, 1997, 1999, 2000, 2002, 2010, 2014, 2015, 2016, 2019  2015, 2016, 2019, 2022
 Leinster Senior Club Hurling Championship: Runners-up 2019

Notable players
 Marty Kavanagh
 Jack Kavanagh
 Paudie Kehoe

References

External links
St. Mullin's GAA Club

Gaelic games clubs in County Carlow
Hurling clubs in County Carlow